The 1993 America East men's basketball tournament was hosted by the higher seeds in head-to-head matchups. The final was held at Daskalakis Athletic Center on the campus of Drexel University. Delaware gained its second consecutive and second overall America East Conference Championship and an automatic berth to the NCAA tournament with its win over Drexel. Delaware was given the 13th seed in the Midwest Regional of the NCAA Tournament and lost in the first round to Louisville 76–70.

Bracket and Results

See also
America East Conference

References

America East Conference men's basketball tournament
1992–93 North Atlantic Conference men's basketball season